This is the discography of South Korean boy band SS501 (pronunciation: "Double-S Five-Oh-One" in English, "Deo-Beur-E-Seu Oh-Gong-Il" in Korean), that was formed under the management of DSP Media, formerly known as Daesung Entertainment and DSP Entertainment. The group debuted on 8 June 2005 with five members: Kim Hyun-joong, Heo Young-saeng, Kim Kyu-jong, Park Jung-min and Kim Hyung-jun.

Although all the members moved to different agencies, after their contracts with DSP Media had expired in June 2010, the group has, according to its leader Kim Hyun-joong, not disbanded. The members are, however, currently pursuing solo careers.

Albums

Studio albums

Compilation albums

Extended plays

Singles

Soundtrack appearances

Videography

DVDs

Music videos

See also

Notes

References

External links
  
 

Discographies of South Korean artists
K-pop music group discographies
Discography